Eisentraut's mouse shrew (Myosorex eisentrauti) is a Myosoricinae shrew found only on the island of Bioko, Equatorial Guinea. It is listed as a critically endangered species due to habitat loss and a restricted range.

References

Myosorex
Endemic fauna of Equatorial Guinea
Mammals described in 1968
Taxa named by Henri Heim de Balsac